Big Brother, also retrospectively known as Big Brother 1, was the first series of the British reality television series Big Brother. The show followed eleven contestants, known as housemates, who were isolated from the outside world for an extended period of time in a custom built House. Each week, one or more of the housemates were evicted by a public vote. The last remaining housemate, Craig Phillips, was declared the winner, winning a cash prize of £70,000.

The series lasted 64 days and was presented by Davina McCall. It launched on Channel 4 on 18 July 2000 and ended on 15 September 2000. Ten housemates entered on the first day, with one additional housemate being introduced in the sixth week. The series was watched by an average of 4.5 million viewers. It became the subject of intense press attention throughout its broadcast, and gained particular notoriety after one housemate, Nick Bateman, was ejected from the House for breaking the rules.

Development
The series first launched in Netherlands, with editions in countries such as Germany proving to be hits with the public. Following the success of the show, it was confirmed that editions for the United States and the United Kingdom were in the works. Andre Anten, who was one of the directors for the original show, said the show was "like live soap... you don't know what is going to happen and that is amazing." In March 2000, it was confirmed that the show had been picked up by Channel 4, and would air in July. Casting for the series began that same month, with applications being available on the official website. Applicants who were shortlisted during the casting process underwent psychological analysis and received a nominal fee for the process. It was reported that the show received over 40,000 applications, and the housemates selected to compete in the series were kept secret until they entered the House. The series featured a live feed, which provided 24-hour coverage of the housemates. To comply with broadcasting standards, the live feed was under an estimated ten-minute delay. Commissioning editor Liz Warner said of the feeds "There's a delay on the web feed, so there's an over-ride [...] We will observe the family viewing policy before the watershed, and make sure we stick to ITC guidelines all the time."

Davina McCall was announced as the host of the show in April 2000. When asked on her feelings when joining the show, McCall stated "It's a lottery whether you take a show on or not, but you have to ask yourself, 'Would I be interested in seeing the show?' I saw a copy of the show from Holland and I loved it - fascinating viewing." The housemates entered the House on 14 July 2000. The live feed launched that day, though the series did not premiere on television until 18 July 2000. The series featured five men and five women who entered the House on the first night, however, a female later entered the house to replace an ejected housemate. Among the group was Anna Nolan, a lesbian who had previously been a nun prior to entering the House. Housemate Andrew "Andy" Davidson admitted to appearing on a live sex show, while Caroline O'Shea had previously worked in a gay bar and sold sex toys. Craig Phillips owned his own building company, while Nick Bateman was a broker. Darren Ramsay was the only housemate this series to have a child.

The first series aired for a total of six days per week, with an episode airing every night excluding Saturday. The shows airing each week were all highlights from the previous day in the House. Two episodes of the series aired on Friday. During the first episode, viewers were shown the highlights from the previous day and McCall revealed the housemate who had been evicted from the House. Two hours following this, the second episode of the night aired which saw the evicted housemate exit the House and participate in an interview with McCall. One of the highlight episodes per week featured a team of psychologists discussing the events of the previous week from their viewpoint. Big Brother 1 lasted for a total of 64 days, officially ending on 15 September 2000. The series had a total of 52 episodes, the fewest episodes for any series thus far. The theme song for the series was produced by Elementfour, and was used for the series intro as well as promotional tools. The series saw the Little Brother segment air during select episodes.

House
For the first series, the House was located in Bow, London near the 3 Mills Studios. The House used was a one-storey house with two bedrooms, a kitchen and dining room, and one bathroom. Throughout the House, there were cameras and microphones spread throughout the rooms, making all areas of the House visible to the cameras. During their stay in the House, the housemates were required to wear microphones at all times, ensuring everything they said in the House was heard. Throughout the House there were two way mirrors lined against the walls, with a production team filming behind them. The bedrooms featured infrared imaging cameras, allowing the cameras to continue filming while the lights were off. The bedrooms in the house were divided amongst the men and women. The Diary Room was where housemates were required to share their thoughts on the events in the house, and were often given tasks. The backyard of the house featured a patio area where the housemates could sit outside. The backyard also featured a chicken coop, and the housemates were able to use the eggs from the chickens as food. The housemates discovered a Jacuzzi in the garden several weeks into the series.

Format

Big Brother was a game show in which a group of contestants, referred to as housemates, lived in isolation from the outside world in a custom built "house", constantly under video surveillance. During their time in the House, the housemates were required to nominate two of their fellow contestants for potential eviction, and the two or more with the most votes would be nominated. This process was mandatory for all housemates, and failure to comply could result in ejection from the house. Despite this, should a housemate enter the House following the launch, they are immune from the first round of nominations they are present for. The public, through a vote conducted by phone, would vote to evict one of the nominated housemates from the House, and the housemate with the most votes from the viewers would be evicted from the House. When only three housemates remained, the public would vote for which of them should win the series, and the housemates with the most votes would become the winner. The housemates were competing for a £70,000 cash prize.

During their time in the House, housemates were given weekly tasks to perform. The housemates would wager a portion of their weekly shopping budget on the task, and would either win double their wagered fund or lose the wagered fund depending on their performance in the task. The housemates were required to work as a group to complete the task, with the format of the tasks varying based on the number of remaining housemates. Should the housemates run out of the food provided for them, an emergency ration was available to them. The housemates were forbidden from discussing nominations, and doing so could result in punishment. The format of the series was mainly seen as a social experiment, and required housemates to interact with others who may have differing ideals, beliefs, and prejudices. Housemates were also required to make visits to the Diary Room during their stay in the House, where they were able to share their thoughts and feelings on their fellow housemates and the game. While in the House, the housemates are free to leave at any time, however, will not be allowed to return to the House. Similarly, a housemate can be removed from the House by production should they repeatedly break the rules set for the housemates. Should a housemate choose to leave the House or be ejected, a replacement housemate will enter the House sometime after their departure. Upon entering the House, new housemates are exempt from the first round of nominations they are present for.

Housemates

Weekly summary

Nominations table

Notes

 :  As a new Housemate, Claire could not nominate or be nominated in this week.
 : During Week 7's nominations held on Day 46, Darren's nominations for Melanie and Craig were overheard by the rest of the house. Big Brother decided to void all nominations and Housemates had to nominate for a second time in which Darren changed his nominations. Had this not happened, Claire, Craig, Darren and Melanie would have faced the public vote.
 : There were no nominations in the final week. The public voted for who they wanted to win, rather than evict.

Ratings
Weekly ratings for each show on Channel 4. All numbers are in millions and provided by BARB.

Controversy and criticism

The series quickly became a source of controversy following its launch, with the show's format being noted as physically and mentally straining. Housemate Nick Bateman was the source of much controversy during his stay in the house. It was later reported that Nick had smuggled a mobile phone into the House, and was using it to receive information from the outside world. Production later searched the House, including Nick's belongings, though no mobile phone was found. On Day 24, a model helicopter was flown over the garden and dropped approximately forty leaflets into the House requesting that Nick be nominated for eviction; the leaflets were removed before the housemates discovered them. On Day 35, it was revealed that Nick had attempted to manipulate the nomination process, which is strictly forbidden in the rules, and Nick was subsequently removed from the house for his actions. Following the revelation that Nick had manipulated the voting, a pen and paper were found in his belongings. Nick's ejection from the house garnered much media attention.

During the eighth week in the House, housemates Craig, Darren, and Melanie were nominated for eviction. Following the announcement, a rogue e-mail was sent out to random e-mail addresses promising a holiday vacation to anyone who dialed the listed number; in actuality, the number was the line to evict Melanie from the House. Despite some controversy over the vote, it was confirmed that the e-mail had had only a small effect on the voting process as Melanie had received nearly 1.8 million more votes than Darren, who came in second in the vote. Upon exiting the House, numerous housemates expressed their disappointment with the series. Housemate Sada criticized the show following her eviction, and claimed that she had been portrayed as a "dippy hippy" rather than her true self. Melanie expressed similar displeasure with the way she was depicted on the show, and later criticized the series for "making storylines that weren't happening." She elaborated by stating "When I watched the tapes I understood that stories and storylines were made to fit any piece of footage into the storyboard and or the caricature that we were portrayed or playing. [...] It was foolish of me to think that they would give a fair portrayal of every single person." Housemate Nick Bateman later criticized Endemol for "leaving them high and dry", and later stated that they were unprepared for the way that the series affected their personal lives. He later commented that they only received one visit from the show's psychiatrist.

References

External links
Big Brother – Series 1 at Channel4.com
"Craig Phillips Official Website"

2000 British television seasons
 1